This is a list of works in the military science fiction subgenre of science fiction, sorted by the creator's surname or, in case of film and television, the title.

Literature

A

Allen, Roger MacBride
 Torch of Honor (1985)
 Rogue Powers (1986)

Anderson, Poul
 The Star Fox (1965)
 The Corridors of Time
 Technic Civilisation Books

Anvil, Christopher
 The Steel, the Mist and the Blazing Sun (1983)

Asprin, Robert Lynn
 Phule's Company series (humorous)
 The Cold Cash War

B

Baldwin, Bill
 The Helmsman Saga
 Canby's Legion (1995)

Buettner, Robert
 Jason Wander series
 Orphan's Legacy Series

Bujold, Lois McMaster
 Shards of Honor (1986)
 Barrayar (1991)
 The Warrior's Apprentice (1986)
 The Vor Game (1990)
 Ethan of Athos (1986)

Bunch, Chris
 The Sten Chronicles (with Allan Cole)
 The Last Legion series

C

Campbell, Jack
Real name: Hemry, John G.

 The Lost Fleet series (2006)
 "Dead End" (written as John G. Hemry) appearing in Breach the Hull, edited by Mike McPhail and published by Dark Quest Books
 "Grendel" a Lost Fleet story appearing in So It Begins, edited by Mike McPhail and published by Dark Quest Books
 "Dawn's Last Light" (written as John G. Hemry) appearing in By Other Means, edited by Mike McPhail and published by Dark Quest Books
 Stark's War (2000-2002) series (written as John G. Hemry), a trilogy covering a conflict between US Army soldiers and their leadership during a campaign that takes place on the Moon.

Card, Orson Scott
 Ender's Game (1985)

Cherryh, C. J.
 Faded Sun series

Chesney, George
 The Battle of Dorking (1871)

Cook, Glen
 Passage at Arms (1985)

Cragg, Dan
 StarFist series (with David Sherman)
Jedi Trial (with David Sherman) (2004)

D

Dalmas, John

 The Lizard War series
 The Regiment series

Dickson, Gordon R.
 Dorsai! (The Genetic General 1960; exp vt Dorsai! 1976)
 The Genetic General (1960)

Dietz, William C.
 Legion series
 The Flood

Douglas, Ian
Real name: Keith, William H., Jr.

Galactic Marines Series:

Heritage Trilogy
 Semper Mars (1998) 
 Luna Marine (1999) 
 Europa Strike (2000) 
Legacy Trilogy
 Star Corps (2003) 
 Battlespace (2006) 
 Star Marines (2007) 
Inheritance Trilogy
 Star Strike (2008) 
 Galactic Corps (2008) 
 Semper Human (2009) 

Star Carrier Series:

 Earth Strike (2010) 
 Center of Gravity (2011) 
 Singularity (2012)

Doyle, Debra
 The Mageworlds Series

Drake, David
 Hammer's Slammers series
 RCN Series

F

Forsberg, John

 Sol War Series (2012)

Frankowski, Leo
 The War with Earth (2003) with Dave Grossman
 Kren of the Mitchegai (2004) with Dave Grossman
 The Two-Space War (2004)

G

Garfinkle, Richard

 Celestial Matters (1996)

Gerrold, David

 Starhunt (1987)

Green, Roland J.
 Peace Company series
 Starcruiser Shenandoah series
 Voyage to Eneh (2000)

Gunn, David
Death's Head series

H

Haldeman, Joe

 The Forever War (1975)

Hamilton, Peter F.
 Fallen Dragon (2001)

Harrison, Harry
 Bill, the Galactic Hero (1965, humorous)
 West of Eden (1984)

Heinlein, Robert A.
 Space Cadet (1949)
 The Long Watch (1950)
 Starship Troopers (1958)

Hemry, John G.
Alias: Jack Campbell

 The Lost Fleet series

Huff, Tanya
Valor Confederation - Staff Sergeant Torin Kerr's aim is to keep both her superiors and her company of space marines alive as they deal with lethal missions throughout the galaxy.
 Valor's Choice (2000)
 The Better Part of Valor (2002)
 A Confederation of Valor (2006 (Omnibus edition of Valor's Choice and The Better Part of Valor)
 The Heart of Valor (2007)
 Valor's Trial (2008)
 The Truth of Valor (2010)

J

K

Keith, William H., Jr.
Alias: Ian Douglas

 Semper Mars: Book One of the Heritage Trilogy (1998)

Kent, Steven L.
 The Clone series

Kloos, Marko
 Frontline Series
 Palladium Wars Series

Kornbluth, Cyril M.
 "The Only Thing We Learn" (1949)

Kratman, Tom

  A Desert Called Peace (2007)
  Carnifex (2008)
  The Lotus Eaters (April 2010)
  The Amazon Legion (April 2011)

L

Lang, Hermann

 The Air Battle (1859)

Lang, Simon

 All the Gods of Eisernon (1973)
 The Elluvon Gift (1975)
 The Trumpets of Tagan (1992)
 Timeslide (1993)
 Hopeship (1994)

Laumer, Keith

 Bolo series of books

Lee, Sharon
 Liaden Universe series of books
 Crystal Soldier
 Crystal Dragon
 Balance of Trade
 Trade Secret
 Local Custom
 Scout's Progress
 Mouse and Dragon
 Conflict of Honors
 Agent of Change
 Carpe Diem
 Plan B
 Fledgling
 I Dare
 Saltation
 Ghost Ship
 Necessity's Child
 Dragon Ship

M

McDonald, Sandra

 The Outback Stars

McLaughlin, Dean
 Hawk Among the Sparrows (1968)

Moon, Elizabeth
 Vatta's War series
 Serrano / Familias series

Morgan, Richard K.
 Takeshi Kovacs series

N

Nagata, Linda
 The Red: First Light

Niven, Larry

 The Man-Kzin Wars (Known Space future History, Shared World; 3 vols 1988-90)

Norton, Andre
 Star Guard (1955)

Nylund, Eric
 Halo: The Fall of Reach
 Halo: First Strike
 Halo: Ghosts of Onyx

P

Pournelle, Jerry E.

 A Spaceship for the King (1973)
 The Mercenary (1977)

R

Reynolds, Mack
Mercenary from Tomorrow (1962  "Mercenary"; exp 1968)

Ringo, John
 Legacy of the Aldenata series
 Posleen War - Central Storyline
A Hymn Before Battle (2000)
Gust Front (2001)
When the Devil Dances (2002)
Hell's Faire (2003)
Hedren War
Eye of the Storm (2009)
Posleen War Sidestories
Watch on the Rhine (2005)
Yellow Eyes (2007)
The Tuloriad (2009) (with Tom Kratman)
Cally's War Spinoff Series
Cally's War (2004)
Sister Time (2007) (with Julie Cochrane)
Honor of the Clan (2009) (with Julie Cochrane)
 Empire of Man Series
Also known as the "Prince Roger Series", Co-written with David Weber
 March Upcountry
 March to the Sea
 March to the Stars
 We Few  (2005)
 The Council Wars Series
There will be Dragons
Emerald Sea
Against the Tide
East of the Sun, West of the Moon

Rosenberg, Joel
 Not for Glory (1988)

S

Saberhagen, Fred
 Berserker series (1963)

Scalzi, John
 Old Man's War series (2005)

Scarborough, Elizabeth Ann
The Healer's War (1988)

Shepherd, Mike
 Kris Longknife series (2004)

Sherman, David
The StarFist series (with Dan Cragg)
The DemonTech series
Jedi Trial (with Dan Cragg) (2004)
 "Surrender and Die" a DemonTech series story appearing in So It Begins, edited by Mike McPhail and published by Dark Quest Books
 "Delaying Action" appearing in By Other Means, edited by Mike McPhail and published by Dark Quest Books

Spinrad, Norman
 The Men in the Jungle (1967)
 The Big Flash (1969)

Steakley, John
 Armor (1984)

Stirling, S M
 Kzin series
 Falkenberg series
 Marching Through Georgia (1984)

T

Karen Traviss
Star Wars: The Clone Wars

Tanaka Yoshiki
 Legend of the Galactic Heroes

Taylor, Travis S.
 Tau Ceti series
 Von Neumann's War

W

Weber, David
 Honor Harrington series
 Safehold series

Wells, H. G.
 War of the Worlds (1898)

White, Steve
 Insurrection (1990) with David Weber.
 Crusade (1992) with David Weber.
 Death Ground (1997) with David Weber.

Williams, Walter Jon
 Dread Empire's Fall series

Michael Z. Williamson
 Freehold series
 A Long Time Until Now

Television, film, and video games

Films
Aliens (1986)
Appleseed (2004)
Appleseed Ex Machina (2007)
Avatar (2009)
Battle: Los Angeles (2011)
Battleship 
(2012)
Battlefield (2018)
Doom (2005)
Edge of Tomorrow (2014)
Ender's Game (2013)
Godzilla (1998)
Godzilla (2014)
Independence Day (1996)
Independence Day: Resurgence (2016)
Lifeforce (1985)
Pacific Rim (2013)
Predator film series (1987,1990,2010,2018)
Screamers (1995)
Soldier (1998)
Spectral (2016)
Stargate (1994)
Stealth (2005)
Starship Troopers (1997)
The 5th Wave, based on the novel series of the same name.
The Day the Earth Stood Still (2008)
The Tomorrow War (2021)
Titan A.E. (2000)
Transformers film series (2007,2009,2011,2014,2017)
Terminator Salvation (2009)
Vexille (2007)
War of the Worlds (2005)

Television and video games
Aldnoah.Zero
Andromeda
Argento Soma
Armored Trooper Votoms
Arpeggio of Blue Steel
Astro Plan
Babylon 5
Banner of the Stars
Battlestar Galactica
BattleTech: The Animated Series
Call of Duty series
Captain Scarlet and the Mysterons
Chōriki Sentai Ohranger
Code Geass
Combat Mecha Xabungle
Command & Conquer
Exosquad
Gears of War
Galactic Drifter Vifam
Genesis Climber Mospeada
Ghost in the Shell
Gunbuster
Gundam
Halo (series)
Kidō Senkan Nadeshiko
Legend of the Galactic Heroes
Macross
Mass Effect
Metal Gear
Mobile Suit Gundam
Muv-Luv
Outwars
Robotech
SeaQuest DSV
Space: Above and Beyond
Space Battleship Yamato
Special Armored Battalion Dorvack
Star Blazers
StarCraft (series)
Stargate Atlantis
Stargate SG-1 (1997–2007), created by Brad Wright & Jonathan Glassner
Stargate Universe
Starship Operators
Star Trek: Deep Space Nine
Star Wars: Clone Wars
Star Wars: The Clone Wars
Strike Witches
The Super Dimension Cavalry Southern Cross
The Super Dimension Fortress Macross
The Super Dimension Century Orguss
Terrahawks
Titanfall
Warhammer 40,000

References
 If the references are cited from electronic editions of e.g. encyclopedias, the title of the article is given as pages may vary.

Further reading
 Clute, J. and P. Nicholls (1995). The Encyclopedia of science fiction. New York, St. Martin's Griffin.
 , D. (2004). Encyclopedia of science fiction. N.Y., Facts On File.
 H. Bruce Franklin (1988), War Stars: The Superweapon and the American Imagination, about war as a theme in US imaginative fiction.
 James, E. and F. Mendlesohn (2003). The Cambridge companion to science fiction. Cambridge ; New York, Cambridge University Press.

Military Science fiction
Military Science fiction